Eille Norwood (born Anthony Edward Brett; 11 October 1861 – 24 December 1948) was an English stage actor, director, and playwright best known today for playing Sherlock Holmes in a series of silent films.

Early life
He was born 11 October 1861 in York as Anthony Edward Brett and attended St John's College, Cambridge (B.A. 1883). Norwood took his stage name from a woman he once loved named Eileen and Norwood in southeast London, where he lived.

Career
His first professional stage appearance was in 1884 with F. R. Benson's Shakespearean company. In 1886-7 he worked for Edward Compton's company. He was active on the stage until 1892, when he became ill and did not recover until about 1899. After acting in a revival of his play The Noble Art, retitled The Talk of the Town, in 1901, he resumed regular stage work. For some years he was employed by Charles Wyndham, appearing for him in My Lady of Rosedale (1904), Captain Drew on Leave (1906), and The Liars (1907). Among many other roles, he toured in 1909 as Raffles in a stage version of the amateur detective. He made his film debut in 1911. He directed the successful production of The Man Who Stayed at Home, which ran in London from December 1914 to July 1916. 

From 1921 to 1923 Norwood played Holmes in forty-seven silent films (45 shorts and 2 features) directed by Maurice Elvey and George Ridgwell. Hubert Willis played Watson in nearly all these films. For the final Holmes film, however, Hubert Willis was replaced by Arthur Cullin. Until Jonny Lee Miller's run in the tv series Elementary (2012 - 2019), Norwood had played Holmes more times than any other actor in film or TV.

Norwood was earlier a stage actor associated with the Brough-Boucicault company, and he wrote several plays which were produced commercially:
Chalk and Cheese (one act)
Hook and Eye 
The Talk of the Town (previous title The Noble Art), about a fusty old solicitor who is hypnotised into competing in a boxing tournament. The play was first performed at the Theatre Royal in York in 1892, and then in 1893 at Terry's in London with Arthur Williams as Andrew Fullalove, and fifteen years later in Australia, with Hugh J. Ward in the lead part.
The Grey Room (with Max Pemberton) - produced in York in 1911

Following his appearance in the films, Norwood appeared on the London stage as Sherlock Holmes in The Return of Sherlock Holmes in October 1923. The play was successful enough that it was toured in Europe without Norwood after its London run. Norwood continued to appear on the London stage until at least 1934.

Personal life
In 1905 Norwood married fellow English stage and silent film actress Ruth Mackay (1878-1949). His step-daughter actress Jane Grahame (1899-1981) married actor/writer Ernest Dudley, creator of another well-known English detective character, Doctor Morelle. In his later years he lived at Corner Cottage, Waverley Lane in Farnham in Surrey.

Norwood died in London on Christmas Eve 1948 at age 87. He is buried in Green Lane Cemetery in Farnham in Surrey.

Quote
Sir Arthur Conan Doyle himself admired Norwood's portrayal, saying: "His wonderful impersonation of Holmes has amazed me."

Filmography

See also
Sherlock Holmes (Stoll film series)
List of people who have played Sherlock Holmes

References

Barnes, Alan. Sherlock Holmes on Screen. Richmond, Surrey: Reynolds and Hearn Ltd., 2002.

External links

 

1861 births
1948 deaths
Alumni of St John's College, Cambridge
English male stage actors
English male film actors
English male silent film actors
Sherlock Holmes
Male actors from York
20th-century English male actors